A container crane (also container handling gantry crane or ship-to-shore crane) is a type of large dockside gantry crane found at container terminals for loading and unloading intermodal containers from container ships.

Container cranes consist of a supporting framework that can traverse the length of a quay or yard on a rail track. Instead of a hook, they are equipped with a specialized handling tool called a spreader. The spreader can be lowered on top of a container and locks onto the container's four locking points ("corner castings") using a twistlock mechanism. Cranes normally transport a single container at once, but some newer cranes have the capability to pick up two to four 20-foot containers at once.

Types 
There are two common types of container handling gantry crane: high profile, where the boom is hinged at the waterside of the crane structure and lifted in the air to clear the ships for navigation, and low profile, where the boom is shuttled toward and over the ship to allow the trolley to load and discharge containers. Low-profile cranes are used where they may be in the flight path of aircraft, such as where a container terminal is located close to an airport. The type of crane selected in container terminal design process is determined by the design vessel and local environment.

Sizes 

Container cranes are generally classified by their lifting capacity and the size of the container ships they can load and unload.

Smaller sizes 
Smaller container cranes, such as straddle carriers, are used at railway sidings to transfer containers from flatcars and well cars to semi-trailers or vice versa. Both the rolling stock and the trailers may pass under the base. Smaller container cranes are also used at break-of-gauge transloading facilities.

Panamax 
A Panamax crane can fully load and unload containers from a panamax class container ship capable of passing through the Panama Canal.

Post-Panamax 
A "post-Panamax" crane can load and unload containers from a container ship too large (too wide) to pass through the Panama Canal.

Super-post-Panamax 

The largest modern container cranes are classified as "super-post-Panamax". Some new cranes have a 120-tonne load capacity, enabling them to lift up to four  or two  containers. Cranes capable of lifting six 20-foot containers have also been designed. Post-Panamax cranes weigh approximately 800–900 tonnes, while the newer-generation super-post-Panamax cranes can weigh 1,600–2,000 tonnes. The largest Super-post-Panamax cranes have an outreach of 26 container rows.

Operation 

The crane is driven by an operator who sits in a cabin suspended from the trolley. The trolley runs along rails located on the top or sides of the boom and girder. The operator runs the trolley over the ship to lift the cargo, usually containers. Once the spreader locks onto the container, the container is lifted, moved over the dock, and placed on a truck chassis (trailer) to be taken to the storage yard. The crane also lifts containers from chassis on the dock to load them onto the ship.

Straddle carriers, sidelifts, reach stackers, or container lorries then manoeuvre underneath the crane base and collect the containers, rapidly moving them away from the dock and to a storage yard. Flatcars or well cars may also be loaded directly beneath the crane base.

Power 
A crane can be powered by two types of power supply: a diesel engine–driven generator located on top of the crane or electric power from the dock. The most common is by electric power from the dock (also known as shore power). The voltage required may range from 4,000 to 13,200 volts.

History 
Cranes were used in harbors starting in the Middle Ages (see crane: harbor usage and list of historical harbour cranes). Modern inter-modal containerization emerged in the mid-1950s from transport strategies developed in the Second World War and the Korean War, and the development of specialized cranes paralleled developments in containerization.

The first container crane was built by Paceco (formerly the Pacific Coast Engineering Company) for Matson at the Encinal Terminal in Alameda, California in 1959.

See also 
 Gantry crane
 Rubber tyred gantry crane
 Straddle carrier

References

External links 

Cranes (machines)
Intermodal containers
Port infrastructure